Ken Hesse (born February 3, 1972 in Denver, Colorado) is a retired American soccer defender who played one game for the MetroStars in Major League Soccer.

Hesse attended Cal State Fullerton, playing soccer from 1990 to 1993.  In 1994, he signed with the Los Angeles Salsa in the American Professional Soccer League.  He moved to the Colorado Foxes for the 1995 APSL season.  On March 4, 1996, the MetroStars selected Hesse in the second round (twelfth overall) of the 1996 MLS Supplemental Draft.  He played the MetroStars first game, then was released.  He then signed with the Anaheim Splash in the Continental Indoor Soccer League.  In 1998, Hesse signed with the Orange County Zodiac in the USISL A-League.  He played with the Zodiac through at least the 2000 season.

References

External links
MetroStars Player Profile

1972 births
Living people
American soccer coaches
American soccer players
Anaheim Splash players
Cal State Fullerton Titans men's soccer players
Colorado Foxes players
Continental Indoor Soccer League players
Los Angeles Salsa players
Major League Soccer players
New York Red Bulls players
Orange County Blue Star players
A-League (1995–2004) players
New York Red Bulls draft picks
Association football defenders